The Kamov V-50 was an armed tandem-rotor transport helicopter project from Kamov, with a projected speed of 400 km/h. The project was abandoned in the late 1960s. Two different models exist.

External links

1960s Soviet military transport aircraft
Kamov aircraft
1960s Soviet helicopters
Abandoned military aircraft projects of the Soviet Union
Military transport helicopters